"Slave" is a song by the English rock band the Rolling Stones on their 1981 album Tattoo You.

Written by Mick Jagger and Keith Richards, "Slave" was originally recorded in Rotterdam, Netherlands (under the working title "Vagina"), using the Rolling Stones Mobile Studio in late January or early February 1975. During that time, the Rolling Stones were faced with the unexpected challenge of filling the recently vacated position of second guitarist, after the abrupt departure of Mick Taylor. The track features Billy Preston on electric piano and organ (although the organ could also have been played by Ian Stewart). The Who's Pete Townshend provided backing vocals for the recording and one of saxophonist Sonny Rollins' three performances on tracks for the album appeared as well. Percussion by Ollie E. Brown was recorded in 1975, with Mike Carabello adding conga during the 1981 overdub sessions.

Called "...a standard Stones blues jam" in the album review by Rolling Stone magazine, "Slave" was the result of the Stones' experiments with funk and dance music during the Black and Blue recording sessions of 1974/75. The lyrics are sparse outside of a brief spoken verse by Jagger and the refrain of "Don't want to be your slave". Keith Richards provide the electric guitar part for the song, with Charlie Watts and Bill Wyman supporting on drums and bass, respectively.

The song was never performed by the Stones on stage - although rehearsed in 2002 - and appears on no compilation album.

The 1994 Virgin Records and 2009 Polydor CD reissues of Tattoo You contain an additional 90 seconds of "Slave".

Personnel

 Track numbers noted in parenthesis below are based on the CD track numbering.

The Rolling Stones
Mick Jaggerlead vocals, backing vocals
Keith Richardselectric guitar, backing vocals
Bill Wymanbass guitar
Charlie Wattsdrums

Additional personnel
Billy Prestonkeyboards
Ollie E. Brownpercussion
Pete Townshendbacking vocals
Sonny Rollinssaxophone
Michael Carabelloconga

References

External links
 Complete official lyrics
 1975 version at 9'40" long with 'slavery' video
 11 minute long version

1981 songs
The Rolling Stones songs
Songs written by Jagger–Richards
Song recordings produced by Jagger–Richards